Kalaktang is a town in the Indian state of Arunachal Pradesh West Kameng is the name of the district that contains town  Kalaktang.

Kalaktang is one of the 60 constituencies of Legislative Assembly of Arunachal Pradesh. Name of current MLA (May-2019) of this constituency is Mr. Dorjee Wangdi Kharma. He was a former D.D.S.E

See also
List of constituencies of Arunachal Pradesh Legislative Assembly
Arunachal Pradesh Legislative Assembly

References

External links

Things to do in Kalaktang

Villages in West Kameng district